SmartMedia is an obsolete flash memory card standard owned by Toshiba, with capacities ranging from 2 MB to 128 MB. The format mostly saw application in the early 2000s in digital cameras and audio production. SmartMedia memory cards are no longer manufactured.

History
The SmartMedia format was launched in the summer of 1995 to compete with the MiniCard, CompactFlash, and PC Card formats. Although memory cards are nowadays associated with digital cameras, digital audio players, PDAs, and similar devices, SmartMedia was pitched as a successor to the computer floppy disk. Indeed, the format was originally named Solid State Floppy Disk Card (SSFDC), and the physical design resembles a miniature 3.5" floppy disk. The SSFDC forum, a consortium aiming to promote SSFDC as an industry standard, was founded in April 1996, consisting of 37 initial members.

A SmartMedia card consists of a single NAND flash chip embedded in a thin plastic card, although some higher-capacity cards contain multiple linked chips. It was one of the smallest and thinnest of the early memory cards, only 0.76 mm thick, and managed to maintain a favorable cost ratio as compared to the others. SmartMedia cards lack a built-in controller chip, which kept the cost down. This feature later caused problems, since some older devices would require firmware updates to handle larger capacity cards. The lack of built-in controller also made it impossible for the card to perform automatic wear levelling, a process which prevents premature failure of any individual block by ensuring that write operations are evenly distributed across the whole device.

SmartMedia cards can be used in a standard 3.5" floppy drive by means of a FlashPath adapter. This remains one of SmartMedia's most distinctive features. This method was not without its own disadvantages, as it required special drivers offering only very basic file read/write capability (or read-only on Macintosh systems) and was limited to floppy-disk transfer speeds. However, this was not so troublesome in the earlier days of the format, when card sizes were limited (generally 8–16 MB), and USB interfaces were both uncommon and low-speed, with digital cameras connecting by "high-speed" serial links that themselves needed drivers and special transfer programs. The 15 minutes taken to read a nearly full 16 MB card directly to hard disk by Flashpath using the slowest (128 kbit/s) PC floppy controller was still simpler and slightly faster than the quickest reliable (115.2 kbit/s) serial link, without the need for connection, synching and thumbnail previewing, and only beaten by expensive parallel-port-based external card readers that could do the same job in 2 minutes or less (≳1000 kbit/s, comparable to USB 1.0) when connected to a compatible high-speed ECP or EPP port (and ~5 minutes using a basic PPT in failsafe mode).

Typically, SmartMedia cards were used as storage for portable devices, in a form that could easily be removed for access by a PC. For example, pictures taken with a digital camera would be stored as image files on a SmartMedia card. A user could copy the images to a computer with a SmartMedia reader. A reader was typically a small box connected by USB or some other serial connection. Modern computers, both laptops and desktops, occasionally have SmartMedia slots built in. While availability of dedicated SmartMedia readers has dropped off, readers that read multiple card types (such as 4-in-1, 10-in-1) continue to include the format, but even these have decreased in quantity, with many dropping SmartMedia in favour of MicroSD and/or Memory Stick Micro.

Some digital audio production equipment of the early 2000s relied on SmartMedia storage, such as the Yamaha QY100 Music Sequencer, Roland MC-09 “PhraseLab” synthesizer, and Korg Triton LE workstation.

SmartMedia was popular in digital cameras and reached its peak in about 2001, when it garnered nearly half of the digital-camera market. It was backed especially by Fujifilm and Olympus, though the format started to exhibit problems, as camera resolutions increased. Cards larger than 128 MB were not available, and the compact digital cameras were reaching a size where even SmartMedia cards were too big to be convenient. Eventually Toshiba switched to smaller, higher-capacity Secure Digital cards, and SmartMedia ceased to have major support after Olympus and Fujifilm both switched to xD. It did not find as much support in PDAs, MP3 players, or pagers as some other formats, especially in North America and Europe, though there was still significant use.

SmartMedia cards larger than 128 MB were never released, although there were rumors of a 256 MB card being planned. Technical specifications for the memory size were released, and the 256 MB cards were even advertised in some places. Some older devices cannot support cards larger than 16 or sometimes 32 MB without a firmware update, if at all. 

SmartMedia cards came in two formats 5 V and the more modern 3.3 V (sometimes marked 3 V) named for their main supply voltages. The packaging was nearly identical, except for the reversed placement of the notched corner. Many older SmartMedia devices only support 5 V SmartMedia cards, whereas many newer devices only support 3.3 V cards. In order to protect 3.3 V cards from being damaged in 5 V-only devices, the card reader should have some mechanical provision (such as detecting the type of notch) to disallow insertion of an unsupported type of card. Some low-cost 5 V-only card readers do not operate this way, and inserting a 3.3 V card into such a 5 V-only reader will result in permanent damage to the card. Dual-voltage card readers are highly recommended.

There is an oversized xD-to-SmartMedia adapter that allows xD cards to use a SmartMedia port, but it does not fit entirely inside a SmartMedia slot. There is a limit on the capacity of the xD card when used in such adapters (sometimes 128 MB or 256 MB), and the device is subject to the restrictions of the SmartMedia reader as well.

SmartMedia memory cards are no longer manufactured as of around 2006. There have been no new devices designed for SmartMedia for quite a long time now. Smartmedia cards are still frequently available on eBay mostly in used condition, with new cards coming up from time to time.

Copy protection 
Many SmartMedia cards include a little-known copy-protection feature known as "ID". This is why many cards are marked with "ID" beside the capacity. This gave every card a unique identification number for use with copy-protection systems. One of the few implementations of this primitive DRM system was by the Korean company Game Park, which used it to protect commercial games for the GP32 handheld gaming system. Samsung's 1999 Yepp Hip-Hop MP3 player also used the feature in order to implement Secure Digital Music Initiative DRM.

Format errors and data loss

SmartMedia cards frequently become corrupted and unusable when the cards are read or written in a card-reading device. Affected SmartMedia cards will be unusable, and the camera or device will be unable to format, read or write to the card. Data loss and a change in the capacity that the device displays are also signs of a low-level format corruption or a corrupted CIS (Card Information System).

Specifications

 Mass: 
 Size: 
 Capacities: 2, 4, 8, 16, 32, 64, 128 MB
 Uses 16-Mbit, 32-Mbit, and 64-Mbit Toshiba TC58-compatible NAND-type flash memory chips
 Flat electrode terminal with 22 pins — (32M & 64M compatible)
 8-bit I/O interface (16-bit in some cases)
 Data transfer rate: 2 MB/s
  write cycles
 10 years storage time without power
 Metallic write-protect sticker
 Compatible with PCMCIA with an adapter
 Compatible with CompactFlash Type II with an adapter
 Compatible with 3.5" floppy drives using FlashPath adapter

In popular culture 
A SmartMedia card, and the FlashPath adapter, is used as a plot device in the film Colombiana (2011), during the opening scenes set in the mid-1990s. A card is swallowed by the 9-year-old orphaned victim to hide it, then regurgitated.

See also
Comparison of memory cards

References

External links 

 SSFDC News Site with PDF document listing news of the 256 MB SmartMedia card technical specifications being released in SmartMedia NEWS 2002.1 NO.1
 Olympus Emporium page on xD/SM to PCMCIA adapter
 SmartMedia format introduction (software considerations)
 SmartMedia card pinout

Solid-state computer storage media
Toshiba brands
Computer-related introductions in 1995
Discontinued media formats